The Agenda with Steve Paikin, or simply The Agenda, is the flagship current affairs television program of TVOntario (TVO), Ontario's public broadcaster. Anchor Steve Paikin states that the show practices long-form journalism. Each hour-long program covers no more than two topics.

The show airs weekdays on TVO at 8:00 and 11:00 p.m., and episodes are available on demand at the show's website and through mobile media.

History
The program's creation was announced as part of programming and re-structuring changes at TVO on 29 June 2006. It replaced Studio 2, a current affairs program that was hosted by Paikin and Paula Todd; it also subsumed Paikin's Fourth Reading, which continued for a number of years as a weekly panel discussion segment on The Agenda.

For a period, on the last Thursday of every month, the program broadcast live from the University of Toronto Munk Centre for International Studies, and focused on world issues with Paikin taking questions from the live audience and online.

In 2012, TVO restructured its program lineup, terminating the programs Allan Gregg in Conversation and Big Ideas. Some lectures that would have been broadcast via Big Ideas were instead covered by the Agenda. The network also devoted more resources to expanding the program "as a multi-platform hub for civic engagement in the big issues of the day".

Journalist Nam Kiwanuka is the program's primary substitute anchor when Paikin is absent, and is the full-time host of the program during the summer months when the show is branded as The Agenda in the Summer.

The show was one of five nominees in the category "Best News or Information Series" for the 2021 Canadian Screen Awards, and Paikin for Host or interviewer, news or information program or series.

Website
The Agenda's website provides access to past episodes, podcasts, and the show’s blogs The Inside Agenda and The Fifth Column, as well as Paikin's blog. Video blogs, timelines of key events, slide shows, and polls, surveys and statistics are also available online.

Notes

References

External links

Television shows filmed in Toronto
TVO original programming
2006 Canadian television series debuts
2000s Canadian television news shows
2010s Canadian television news shows